Sophie Nogler (25 April 1924 – 12 October 2015) was an Austrian alpine skier who competed in the 1948 Winter Olympics.

References

1924 births
2015 deaths
Austrian female alpine skiers
Olympic alpine skiers of Austria
Alpine skiers at the 1948 Winter Olympics
People from Santa Cristina Gherdëina
Sportspeople from Südtirol